Wilhelm Koppers (1886–1961) was a Catholic priest and cultural anthropologist.

References

1886 births
1961 deaths
Austrian anthropologists
20th-century anthropologists
Germanic studies scholars
Indo-Europeanists
Writers on Germanic paganism